Passion Play is a live action role-playing game created by Bill Bridges and Bill Maxwell and first published by Holistic Design in 1999. Passion Play is based on the 1996 table top role-playing game Fading Suns.

Reviews
Pyramid

See also 

 Fading Suns

References

External links 

 Passion Play review on RPG.net, a specialized website

Holistic Design games
 
Role-playing games introduced in 1999